Sven Michel (born 15 July 1990) is a German professional footballer who plays as a forward for Bundesliga club Union Berlin.

References

External links

1990 births
Living people
Association football forwards
German footballers
Borussia Mönchengladbach II players
Sportfreunde Siegen players
FC Energie Cottbus players
SC Paderborn 07 players
1. FC Union Berlin players
Bundesliga players
2. Bundesliga players
3. Liga players
Regionalliga players
21st-century German people